Netball was one of 17 sports that were contested at the 2010 Commonwealth Games in Delhi. Netball is a core sport for women at the Commonwealth Games, and one of only three events in the 2010 programme for women only (the other two are rhythmic gymnastics and synchronised swimming). Netball at the Commonwealth Games is one of the premier events in international netball, and the 2010 event was the fourth time that the sport has been contested at the Games.

Twelve participating nations were divided into two pools. After the preliminary matches, Australia and Jamaica progressed to the medal playoffs from Pool A, while New Zealand and England advanced from Pool B. The bronze medal for the event was won by England, who defeated Jamaica in the bronze medal playoff. The gold medal match was contested between Australia and New Zealand. After going into double extra-time, New Zealand won the gold medal, defeating Australia 66–64. The final went on for 84 minutes, the longest ever official game.

Overview

Participating nations
Twelve nations competed in netball at the 2010 Commonwealth Games:
 India was included as the host nation for the Games;
 The top six teams from the IFNA World Rankings automatically qualified;
 The five remaining teams were selected through regional qualifying tournaments.

Format
The twelve participating nations are divided into two pools of six teams. Within each pool, teams play each other once in a round robin, at the end of which the top two teams from each pool progressed to the medal playoffs; the remaining teams competed in classification matches. In the first day of medal playoff matches, the top team from each pool played the second team from the opposing pool. The winners of these matches contested the gold medal match, while the losing teams contested the bronze medal match. The gold medal match was scheduled to be the last medal event at the 2010 Games.

Umpires

Venue
All matches were held at the Thyagaraj Sports Complex in New Delhi. The newly built venue has a seating capacity of 4,494. The facility includes one maple-wood match court and two training courts.

Preliminary round

Pool A

 Goal percentage (G%) = 100 × GF/GA. Accurate to one decimal place.
 Highlighted teams advanced to the medal playoffs; other teams contested classification matches.

Pool B

 Goal percentage (G%) = 100 × GF/GA. Accurate to one decimal place.
 Highlighted teams advanced to the medal playoffs; other teams contested classification matches.

Classification matches

Medal playoffs

Final standings

Medallists

References

External links
 Official website: XIX Commonwealth Games – Netball
 Netball coverage from NetballOnline.com

 
Netball
2010
2010 in netball